Gawler Place is a single-lane road in the city centre of Adelaide, the capital of South Australia. It runs north to south from North Terrace to Wakefield Street, parallel to and approximately midway between King William and Pulteney Streets.

History
Prior to 1904, the lanes that now make up Gawler Place included Rundle Place (North Terrace to Rundle Street, now Rundle Mall), Gawler Place (Rundle to Grenfell Street) and Freeman Street (Grenfell to Wakefield Street), as well as Gawler Place.

The Adelaide City Council planned an upgrade to Gawler Place to commence in early 2018. However work finally began in January 2019. The upgrade includes "new footpath and road surfaces, lighting, seating and spaces for socialising".

Historic buildings

There are a number of historic buildings situated on Gawler Place including Gawler Chambers (188 North Terrace, corner of North Terrace and Gawler Pl), the Oriental Hotel (42-50 Gawler Pl), (former) Claridge House (52-56 Gawler Pl), and the Allan's Building (58-60 Gawler Pl).

Description
As Rundle Mall is a pedestrian mall, driving across it on Gawler Place is not permitted. Between North Terrace and Rundle Mall, Gawler Place permits two-way traffic, with access to a multi-storey car park, and a taxi rank near Rundle Mall. It is also two-way between Rundle Mall and Grenfell Street, for access to businesses on this stretch. South of Grenfell Street, Gawler Place is one-way, for northbound vehicles only. A busy stretch of road, about 25,000 people walk between Grenfell Street and North Terrace daily.

Gawler Place continues north of North Terrace as Kintore Avenue downhill, between the State Library of South Australia and University of Adelaide on the east and National War Memorial, Government House and Torrens Parade Ground on the west to Victoria Drive, which runs alongside the Torrens Lake.

Junctions

References

External links
State Library of South Australia collection of Gawler Place photographs

Streets in Adelaide